Sainik School Punglwa is boys' school in Peren, Nagaland, India.  It was established by the Indian government in 2007 and is part of the Sainik School network.

The school prepares its students for entry into the National Defence Academy, Khadakwasla, Pune.

Administration 
The school is administered by the Sainik Schools Society, under the supervision of the Indian Ministry of Defence.

The Chief of Staff, 3 Corps is the chairman of the school's Local Board of Administration.

Relationship to the National Cadet Corps
The school has an Independent Company of Junior and Senior Division N.C.C. as an integral part, including all the three divisions of the defence services: the Army, Navy and Air Force.

References

External links 
 
 Sainik Schools Society

Sainik schools
Boys' schools in India
High schools and secondary schools in Nagaland
2007 establishments in Nagaland
Educational institutions established in 2007
Peren district